The 1971 National Indoor Championships – Doubles was an event of the 1971 National Indoor Championships tennis tournament held at the Hampton Roads Coliseum in Hampton, Virginia in the United States from March 1 through March 7, 1971. Ilie Năstase and Ion Ţiriac won the doubles title, defeating Clark Graebner and Thomaz Koch 6–4, 4–6, 7–5(5–0) in the final.

Draw

References

External links
 ITF tournament edition details

Tennis in Virginia
National Indoor Championships